Illya Vahramovych Tereshchenko (born 27 May 1998), is a Ukrainian professional footballer who plays for Lyubomyr Stavyshche.

Club career
Tereshchenko made his professional Fortuna Liga debut for Zemplín Michalovce against ViOn Zlaté Moravce on 5 November 2016. After Michalovce, he played for Slovan Bratislava, Železiarne Podbrezová and Slovan Duslo Šaľa.

References

External links
 
 Fortuna Liga profile
 Futbalnet profile
 
 

1998 births
Living people
Footballers from Kyiv
Ukrainian footballers
Ukraine youth international footballers
Association football forwards
MFK Zemplín Michalovce players
ŠK Slovan Bratislava players
FK Železiarne Podbrezová players
FK Slovan Duslo Šaľa players
FC Dinaz Vyshhorod players
FK Slavoj Trebišov players
FC Lyubomyr Stavyshche players
Slovak Super Liga players
2. Liga (Slovakia) players
3. Liga (Slovakia) players
Ukrainian Second League players
Ukrainian expatriate footballers
Expatriate footballers in Slovakia
Ukrainian expatriate sportspeople in Slovakia